The Lotus 92 was a Formula One racing car designed by Martin Ogilvie along with Team Lotus founder Colin Chapman before Chapman died in December 1982. The 92 was used by Lotus in the first part of the 1983 Formula One season.

The car was driven regularly by Nigel Mansell and also in one race (the 1983 Brazilian Grand Prix) by Elio de Angelis. Engine problems on the warmup lap for de Angelis' Renault turbo-engined Lotus 93T forced him into the spare 92, which eventually led to his disqualification, for changing from a Renault-engined car to a Cosworth-engined one. The 92's best result was sixth place for Mansell at the Detroit Grand Prix.

The 92 was the last non-turbo car designed and raced by Lotus until the turbo engines were banned from the  season. It was also the last Lotus car to carry the Cosworth DFY V8 engine (a development of the Keith Duckworth designed Cosworth DFV which Lotus had introduced to F1 in ), while also being the first Lotus to use active suspension. The suspension system gave much trouble and virtually eroded Mansell's confidence in such things. Though he would eventually win the F1 title 9 years later in a car with active suspension - the Williams FW14B.

Complete Formula One results
(key)

References

92